FC Porto is a Portuguese sports club, best known for its association football team.

FC Porto may also refer to:
FC Porto B, the reserve football team of FC Porto
FC Porto Juniors, the youth football teams of FC Porto
FC Porto (basketball), the basketball section of FC Porto
FC Porto (billiards), the billiards section of FC Porto
FC Porto (goalball), part of the adapted sports section of FC Porto
FC Porto (handball), the handball section of FC Porto
FC Porto (roller hockey), the roller hockey section of FC Porto
FC Porto (Superleague Formula team), a car racing team (discontinued)
FC Porto (swimming), the swimming section of FC Porto
W52–FC Porto, a road cycling team sponsored by FC Porto

FC Porto may also refer to derivative or affiliated clubs:
FC Porto de Macau, an affiliated club from Macau
FC Porto Taibesse, an association football club from East Timor
FC Porto Real, an association football club from São Tomé and Príncipe